MTN Gladiators is a game show produced by MTN for SABC3 in South Africa from 1999 to 2001. Following South Africa's initial participation in the second International Gladiators and Springbok Challenge  tournaments in Birmingham, England, the format developed a cult following in South Africa. In 1998 production finally began for a domestic series, eventually airing in 1999.

The show pitted contestants in a variety of physical events against the 'Gladiators', who would attempt to prevent them from achieving maximum points on a variety of games.  After this, the two contenders would race each other on the Eliminator, an assault course containing climbing, balancing, and cargo nets. The contender with the most points received a half second head start for every 1 point they were in front by.

The show was originally presented by Glenn Hicks - executive producer of the first four series - and Ursula Staplefeldt. Following Glenn's departure from the show in 2000, he was replaced by James Lennox when it was resurrected for its penultimate fifth series in 2001.

The referees were legendary South African cricketer Cyril Mitchley (1999 - 2000) and international strongman Wayne "The Boss" Price (2001). The timekeepers over the show's run were Ingrid Chantler (1999-2000), and female Gladiator ICE (2001) - unable to compete due to pregnancy. The Gladiators and crowds alike were cheered on by a group of cheerleaders, known as G-Force.

All the MTN Gladiators tapings took place at the Standard Bank Arena, Johannesburg (1999 - 2000) and Big Top Arena, Carnival City (2001) in South Africa.

A special second Springbok Challenge series, known simply as Gladiators: Springbok Challenge 2, against a team of British Gladiators and contenders was filmed in South Africa in 2000.

Gladiators

Notes

External links
Dispatch Online - Gladiator fans, are you ready?
TamyFoxBaker - Former Gladiator FOX's own website.

1999 South African television series debuts
2001 South African television series endings
South African game shows
Gladiators (franchise)
1990s South African television series
2000s South African television series